Schizopyge niger, the Alghad snowtrout, is a species of cyprinid freshwater fish that lives in cold lakes and nearby channels in the Kashmir region in India and Pakistan.

References

niger
Fish described in 1838